Anshuman Rath (born 5 November 1997) is a Hong Kong cricketer who previously captained the Hong Kong national cricket team. In September 2019, he retired from Hong Kong national team to pursue a career in India. In August 2021, he became eligible to play as a local player in India as an Indian passport holder, and had represented Odisha since the 2021–22 Indian domestic cricket season.

Rath returned to Hong Kong's squad for the Hong Kong Quadrangular Series in March 2023.

Personal life
Anshuman Rath's home is based in Satyanagar, Bhubaneswar, Odisha, India and he belongs to an Odia family. In the late 1990s, his father left India for business and settled in Hong Kong. Anshuman was born in the year 1997 in Hong Kong.

He started playing cricket at the age of four with Tarang, when his father introduced him to the sport. He attended West Island School.

International career
He made his One Day International (ODI) debut for Hong Kong on 8 November 2014 against Papua New Guinea in Australia. He made his Twenty20 International debut for Hong Kong against Nepal at the 2015 ICC World Twenty20 Qualifier tournament on 15 July 2015. He made his first-class debut for Hong Kong against the United Arab Emirates in the 2015–17 ICC Intercontinental Cup tournament on 11 November 2015.

On 16 February 2017 in the 2015–17 ICC World Cricket League Championship match against the Netherlands, he scored his maiden List A century and added 197 runs for the third wicket with Babar Hayat. This was a List A record for Hong Kong and a record for any wicket in a World Cricket League match.

In December 2017, he scored his first century in an ODI match, when he made 143 not out against Papua New Guinea in the 2015–17 ICC World Cricket League Championship. It was also the highest individual score by a Hong Kong batsman in an ODI match. He finished as the leading run-scorer in the 2015–17 ICC World Cricket League Championship, with a total of 678 runs from 10 matches.

In August 2018, he was named the vice-captain of Hong Kong's squad for the 2018 Asia Cup Qualifier tournament. However, prior to the tournament, he replaced Babar Hayat as captain, after Hayat stepped down from the role. Hong Kong won the qualifier tournament, and he was then named as captain of Hong Kong's squad for the 2018 Asia Cup.

In April 2019, he was named as the captain of Hong Kong's squad for the 2019 ICC World Cricket League Division Two tournament in Namibia. He was the leading run-scorer in the tournament, with 290 runs in six matches. He and Nizakat Khan scored 174 against India, the highest partnership for Hong Kong in ODIs. Hong Kong lost the match by 26 runs but the fight was praised by the Indian team.

T20 franchise career
In June 2019, he was selected to play for the Edmonton Royals franchise team in the 2019 Global T20 Canada tournament.

References

External links
 

1997 births
Living people
Hong Kong cricketers
Hong Kong One Day International cricketers
Hong Kong Twenty20 International cricketers
Place of birth missing (living people)
Hong Kong people of Indian descent
Sportspeople of Indian descent
People educated at Harrow School
Alumni of West Island School
Indian expatriates in Hong Kong
Odia people
Indian cricketers
Odisha cricketers
Cricketers from Odisha
Sportspeople from Bhubaneswar
Wicket-keepers